
This is a list of the 28 players who earned 2023 European Tour cards through Q School in 2022.

 2023 European Tour rookie
 First-time full member in 2023 but ineligible for Rookie of the Year award

Wins on the European Tour in 2023

Runner-up finishes on the European Tour in 2023

See also
2022 Challenge Tour graduates
2023 European Tour

References

European Tour
European Tour Qualifying School Graduates
European Tour Qualifying School Graduates